Moby Dick is a 1998 American television miniseries based on Herman Melville's 1851 novel of the same name. It was filmed in Australia in 1997 and first released in the United States in 1998. The miniseries consisted of two episodes, each running two hours with commercials on March 15 and 16 of 1998 on the USA Network. This is Gregory Peck's final on-screen role.

Plot
Ishmael is a young sailor who joins the crew of the whaling ship Pequod. Queequeg, a Pacific Islander and experienced whaler, meets Ishmael at an inn and joins him in this whaling journey. The captain of the Pequod, Ahab, soon reveals his obsession with the legendary sperm whale Moby Dick, who bit off Ahab's leg years earlier. Since that day, Ahab has sworn to find and kill Moby Dick himself.

Ahab rejects the repeated pleas of his first mate, Starbuck, to stop chasing Moby Dick because the ship is operating at a loss due to Ahab's apathy towards  hunting whales other than Moby Dick and because he fears the captain's narrow-minded pursuit puts the entire crew's safety at risk. Queequeg, assigned to work as Starbuck's harpooner, also disagrees with the captain's mission and engages in passive resistance by completely refusing to do any work on the ship, even throwing down his harpoon when ordered to join a whale hunt.

As months pass by with no sighting of Moby Dick, Ahab's madness becomes more and more obvious. He refuses to assist another ship searching for the son of their captain, who was lost at sea. He forces the crew to drag the Pequod over ice with ropes and sail through a massive storm. Yet even as their fellow sailors perish and their survival becomes more and more uncertain, the majority of the crew refuses to challenge Ahab, eager to help him claim the prize of Moby Dick.

Finally, the Pequod locates Moby Dick, and Ahab personally leads a group of men to kill the beast. Despite being harpooned, the whale manages to crush the boat and kill everyone except Ahab. When the captain tries to untangle his harpoon rope, he gets caught and Moby Dick drags him underwater to his death. The Pequod is rammed and sinks, with Ishmael the only survivor.

Cast
 Patrick Stewart as Captain Ahab
 Henry Thomas as Ishmael
 Gregory Peck as Father Mapple
 Ted Levine as Starbuck
 Bruce Spence as Elijah
 Hugh Keays-Byrne as Mr. Stubb
 Piripi Waretini as Queequeg
 Dominic Purcell as Bulkington
 Norman D. Golden II as Little Pip
 Norman Yemm as Carpenter
 Shane Feeney Connor as Mr. Flask
 Peter Sumner as Captain Gardiner
 Matthew Montoya as Tashtego
 Michael Edward Stevens as Dagoo
 Kee Chan as Fedallah
 Warren Owens as Cook

Patrick Stewart took the lead role shortly after making a striking reference to the book, and quoting from it, in Star Trek: First Contact.

Gregory Peck appeared as Father Mapple more than 40 years after he played Ahab in the 1956 film adaptation directed by John Huston.

Awards
Gregory Peck won the Golden Globe Award for Best Supporting Actor. The series also won awards for its music and was nominated for several Emmy Awards.

See also 
 Adaptations of Moby-Dick

References

External links 
 
 

1998 television films
1998 films
1990s American television miniseries
APRA Award winners
USA Network original films
Films based on Moby-Dick
Television shows based on American novels
Television series set in the 19th century
Films directed by Franc Roddam